Všechovice is a municipality and village in Přerov District in the Olomouc Region of the Czech Republic. It has about 900 inhabitants.

History
The first written mention of Všechovice is from 1281.

Notable people
Bohuslav Fuchs (1895–1977), architect

References

Villages in Přerov District